Samuel Knox (March 21, 1815 – March 7, 1905) was a U.S. Representative from Missouri.

Born in Blandford, Massachusetts, Knox attended the common schools, graduated in 1836 from Williams College (Williamstown, Massachusetts) and then earned a degree from the law department of Harvard University in 1838. He moved to St. Louis, Missouri in 1838 and was admitted to the bar and practiced law there, later becoming a city counselor in 1845. As an Unconditional Unionist he ran against Francis P. Blair, Jr. for election to the 38th Congress. Eventually successful in contesting the results, he replaced Blair, serving from June 10, 1864, to March 3, 1865. However, he was unsuccessful in his bid for re-election in 1864 to the 39th Congress. After going back to St. Louis, he resumed practicing law. He returned to Blandford, Massachusetts, where he died March 7, 1905, and was interred in Peabody Cemetery, in Springfield, Massachusetts. In the early 1850s, Knox helped to provide the land for the Alpine Presbyterian Church in Menlo, Georgia after participating in the approval for a committee to organize the church.

References

External links 
 

1815 births
1905 deaths
People from Blandford, Massachusetts
Unconditional Union Party members of the United States House of Representatives from Missouri
Missouri Unconditional Unionists
Williams College alumni
Harvard Law School alumni
19th-century American politicians
Lawyers from St. Louis
Members of the United States House of Representatives from Missouri